John Adolf Arenhold (9 May 1931 – 30 September 2017) was a South African cricketer who played first-class cricket from 1953 to 1960.

Arenhold went to school at Diocesan College, Cape Town, before attending University College, Oxford. He played as an opening bowler for Oxford University from 1953 to 1955, gaining his Blue in 1954. His best bowling figures for Oxford were 6 for 37 against Middlesex in 1954. When his form fell away in 1955 he was left out of the side, only to take his best first-class figures, 7 for 97, against Oxford for D.R. Jardine's XI.

After graduating from Oxford he lived from 1956 to 1958 in Ceylon, working for Shell as a management trainee. He played cricket for Colombo Cricket Club and Rugby union for Dimbulla Athletic and Cricket Club, and represented Ceylon at both sports. Playing for Ceylon in the Gopalan Trophy against Madras in 1956-57 he took 6 for 17 and 5 for 26 to help Ceylon to a five-wicket victory at Colombo Oval. His match figures of 11 for 43 are a record for Sri Lanka in Gopalan Trophy matches.

Returning to South Africa, he played a season for Orange Free State in the Currie Cup, opening the bowling with Sydney Burke and taking 16 wickets at an average of 20.56 in five matches. He retired from first-class cricket after the season.

References

External links
 John Arenhold at CricketArchive
 

1931 births
2017 deaths
South African cricketers
Alumni of Diocesan College, Cape Town
Alumni of University College, Oxford
Oxford University cricketers
All-Ceylon cricketers
Free State cricketers
Sri Lankan people of South African descent
Sri Lankan rugby union players
D. R. Jardine's XI cricketers